Diocese of Nebbi may refer to the following ecclesiastical jurisdictions:
 Anglican Diocese of Nebbi (f. 1993), Northern Uganda
 Roman Catholic Diocese of Nebbi (f. 1996), Northern Uganda